Shapurabad (also Romanized as Shāpūrābād; also known as Shāpūrābād and Shāpūrābād) is a city in Habibabad District, in Borkhar County, Isfahan Province, Iran.  At the 2006 census, its population was 5,172, in 1,312 families.

References

Populated places in Borkhar County

Cities in Isfahan Province